Onyx is an American hardcore hip hop group from South Jamaica, Queens, New York City, formed in 1988 by Fredro Starr, Suavé (also known as Sonny Seeza) and the late Big DS. Sticky Fingaz joined the group in 1991.

They are best known for their 1993 platinum hit single "Slam", which The Source magazine described as a song that introduced the art of slam dancing into hip-hop. The group has released eight studio albums, three of which have charted in the Billboard 200 albums chart Top 25. Their debut album, Bacdafucup, has been certified platinum, won Best Rap Album at the Soul Train Music Awards and was selected as one of The Source magazine's 100 Best Rap Albums.

They are also notable for their style: loud screaming, aggression, fighting with each other, stage diving, throwing water, rapping with grimy voices, and bald head fashion.

History 
Onyx was formed in 1988 by schoolmates Fredro Starr, Sonny Seeza, and Big DS. They decided to name the band after the onyx stone. The band began recording their first demos in the basement of B-Wiz with drum machine beats from an SP-12. In 1989, Onyx signed Jeffrey Harris as their manager, who helped them secure a contract with the label Profile Records. On April 25, 1990, the group released their first single, Ah, And We Do It Like This, to low sales. On July 13, 1991, while in a traffic jam at The Jones Beach GreekFest Festival, the band members met music producer Jam Master Jay, who agreed to give them two months to submit a demo to his record company. When the deadline came, Seeza and Big DS couldn't make it to the studio to record the demo, so Jeffrey Harris, the manager of Onyx, asked Fredro to come to the studio with his cousin, Kirk Jones, who at the time was doing a solo career under the name Trop. Fredro and Jones recorded two records for the demo, "Stik 'N' Muve" and "Exercise". The demo were accepted by Jam Master Jay, who signed the band to his record label, Jam Master Jay Records. Jones subsequently joined the band with the stage name Sticky Fingaz. In 1991 the band lost all of its records when its music producer, B-Wiz, was killed while selling cocaine in Baltimore. Later that year, Onyx hired Chyskillz as its new music producer.

In 1993, Onyx released their debut album, entitled Bacdafucup. The album proved to be successful, receiving a platinum certification from the RIAA and peaked at #10 on the Billboard 200, the group's highest debut at that point. In 1998, the album was selected as one of The Source's 100 Best Albums. Three of the album's songs reached the Billboard charts; "Throw Ya Gunz", "Slam", and "Shiftee". Their breakout single, "Slam", was aired on MTV and BET, causing the song to reach #4 on the Billboard Hot 100. "Slam" was certified Platinum by the RIAA on August 10, 1993. In 1994, Big DS left the group to start a solo career, producing music under his own record label called Illyotic Music. In 1995 Onyx released its second album, All We Got Iz Us, and founded its own record label, Armee Records, distributed through MCA Records. Through its record label, the band produced music by Gang Green, All City, Panama P.I., and Choclatt. In April 1995 Marvel Music, a short-lived imprint of Marvel Comics, released a comic book based on the band called "Onyx: Fight!". Written by Karl Bollers and drawn by Larry Lee, the comic depicted a post-apocalyptic New York City where Onyx forms an underground rebellion. In 1998 the band released their third album Shut 'Em Down, which featured appearances from other bands, including X-1, DMX, 50 Cent, All City, Mr. Cheeks, Wu-Tang Clan, N.O.R.E., and Big Pun. Produced by Keith Horne, Self, and others, the album peaked at #10 on the Billboard 200, selling 500,000 units. Three of the album's songs reached the Billboard charts; The Worst, Shut 'Em Down, and React. Shut 'Em Down was Onyx's last album on the Def Jam Recordings label.

In 2001, Onyx released their fourth album, Bacdafucup Part II, through Koch Records. Produced by Davinci, DR Period, and others, the album included twelve new tracks, including "Feel Me", which was recorded on the night of September 11, 2001, and was dedicated to the events that had happened that day. In 2003 Onyx released their fifth album, Triggernometry, consisting of ten new tracks, with eleven stories from the lives the group's members in between the tracks. On May 22, 2003, former Onyx member Big DS died in a hospital in Queens, New York at the age of 31 after receiving chemotherapy for lymphatic cancer. Onyx released a sixteen-track collection of previously unreleased songs Cold Case Files through Iceman Music Group on August 19, 2008. The collection features underground singles, lost studio recordings from the group's first three albums, and appearances from Method Man, deceased Onyx affiliate X1, and Gang Green. In 2009, Onyx was planning to release an album called Black Rock, but postponed its release due to the release of another rap album called "Blakroc". The same year, Sonny Seeza left the band to begin a solo career. On October 31, 2012, after having returned from an overseas tour, Onyx released the first track of their upcoming album CUZO on YouTube. Despite announcing that the CUZO album would be released on September 5, 2013, it was never released. In August 2012, Onyx released their second compilation album, titled Cold Case Files Vol. 2.

On March 18, 2014, Onyx released their first album in over a decade, called Wakedafucup. Released through Goon MuSick, the album is entirely produced by Snowgoons. The album features guest appearances from  Sean Price, Papoose, Cormega, Reks, Snak the Ripper, and ASAP Ferg. WakeDaFucUp was named by XXL as one of the best hip-hop albums of 2014. In 2014, X-Ray Records (a division of Cleopatra Records) released a compilation of Onyx's unreleased songs called #TURNDAFUCUP. The collection mainly contained songs from the unreleased album CUZO, in addition to modern trap style remixes of several of their older songs. It featured guest appearances by Busta Rhymes, Raekwon, Myster DL, Ras Kass, and Ill Bill. In 2015, Onyx released Against All Authorities, a six track EP protesting racial injustice and police brutality in the United States. The EP was produced by Canadian producer Scopic and features appearances by Sick Flo, Ras Kass, Jasia'n, and Canadian rapper Merkules. Later that year, Def Jam released an eleven-track compilation of Onyx's classic songs called ICON. On November 22, 2015, Snowgoons attempted to raise funds on Kickstarter for a new project called Onyx vs. M.O.P., planned to be a new collaboration album that would have been released in spring of the next year. Because the project only received $10,000 out of its $30,000 goal, it was canceled on December 18, 2015. In 2017, Onyx collaborated with the Dutch hardcore hip hop group Dope D.O.D. to release the collaboration album Shotgunz In Hell. The album features appearances by Sick Flo, Snak the Ripper, Dopey Rotten, and DJ Nelson.

In 2018, Onyx released Black Rock, which was produced by Onyx and Slovenian producer Kid AC.

On May 31, 2019, the album "100 Mad" was released, the title referring to Onyx's artist collective.  Production on the album included Snowgoons and The Alchemist, and guest vocalists included Conway The Machine, Tha God Fahim, Jay Nice, Planet Asia, Termanology and more.

In July 2019, Onyx announced the release of a new compilation of unreleased songs called Lost Treasures. The cover for this compilation was drawn by a designer from Russia. The compilation was released through X-Ray Records on February 7, 2020.

On November 15, 2019, the group released the eighth studio album SnowMads, entirely produced by Snowgoons. Among the guests on the album were rappers Bumpy Knuckles aka Freddy Foxxx, Flee Lord, Nems, SickFlo, Knuckles of NBS and Ufo Fev. The album was chosen as "The best rap album of 2019" by the Russian website Rap.Ru, as well as "one of the best rap albums of 2019" by the editors of the Russian website HipHop4Real. The album was featured on a Russian late-night talk show Evening Urgant hosted by Ivan Urgant on Channel One, where Onyx performed their most famous hit "Slam", as well as on the Bulgarian show Шоуто на Николаос Цитиридис on bTV, where members of the group gave an interview and performed the song "Kill Da Mic".

In 2020, Lords Of The Underground released a video for the song "Whats Up", recorded with Onyx, later was released a single for this song.

On April 9, 2021, the group released their ninth studio album, Onyx 4 Life. The album features rappers Mad Lion, Cappadonna, Panama P.I., Planet Asia, SickFlo and Snak the Ripper. Music for the album was produced by Chilean beatmakers Crack Brodas (DJ Audas and El Bruto CHR). Onyx released a two visuals for "Coming Outside" and "Ahh Yeah". The cover for the new album was painted by the Russian tattoo artist Alexey Mashkow.

Members

Current members 
 Fredro Starr (1988–present)
 Sticky Fingaz (1991–present)

Former members 
 Big DS (1988–1994) (died 2003)
 Sonny Seeza (1988–2009)

Timeline

Video games 
Rap Jam: Volume One (1995)
Def Jam: Fight for NY (2004)
Law & Order: Criminal Intent (2005)Def Jam: Icon (2007)

 Discography 

Studio albumsBacdafucup (1993)All We Got Iz Us (1995)Shut 'Em Down (1998)Bacdafucup Part II (2002)Triggernometry (2003)#WakeDaFucUp (2014)Black Rock (2018)SnowMads (2019)Onyx 4 Life (2021)1993 (2022)Onyx Versus Everybody (2022)World Take Over (2022)

EPAgainst All Authorities (2015)

Collaborative albumsShotgunz In Hell (2017) (with Dope D.O.D.)

Compilation albumsCold Case Files: Vol. 1 (2008)100 Mad Niggaz With Gunz (Hosted By DJ Omega Red) (2009)100 Mad. Part 2 (Hosted by DJ Motion) (2010)Cold Case Files: Vol. 2 (2012)#Turndafucup (2014)ICON (2015)Onyx present 100 Mad (2019)Lost Treasures (2020)#Turndafucup (The Original Sessions) (2022)

 Awards and nominations 
In 1994, for the album Bacdafucup, Onyx was nominated for "Favorite New Rap/Hip-Hop Artist" at the American Music Awards and won "Best Rap Album" at the Soul Train Music Awards. Onyx was also nominated five times at The Source Hip Hop Music Awards ceremony in 1994.

At the end of 1993, the US magazines Billboard and Cashbox placed Onyx on several of their final annual charts. In 1996, CMJ New Music Monthly placed the album All We Got Iz Us in their list The 25 Best Hip-Hop Albums of 1995. In 2014, #WakeDaFucUp was named as one of the best hip-hop albums of 2014 by XXL. In 2020, SnowMads'' was chosen as "The Best Rap Album of 2019: Readers' Choice" by the Russian website Rap.Ru.

References

External links 

African-American musical groups
Def Jam Recordings artists
JMJ Records artists
Columbia Records artists
MNRK Music Group artists
Hip hop groups from New York City
Musical groups established in 1988
Musical groups from Queens, New York
Hardcore hip hop groups